"I Was a Fool" is a 2013 song by Tegan and Sara

I Was a Fool may also refer to:
"I Was A Fool", song by Elmore James and His Broomdusters, E. James & Josea	1955
"I Was a Fool", song by June Christy 1953, Dan Belloc and His Orchestra,  Watson, Belloc, Douglas 1953 
"I Was A Fool", song by Frankie Vaughan,  Frank Abelson 	1960
"I Was A Fool", song by The Impalas,  Dominic Chiaiavalli	1959
"I Was A Fool", song by Johnnie Allan 1978, originally written Tommy Stiglets	1959, Johnny Fairchild and The  Nite Riders
"I Was A Fool", song by Roy Orbison, written Orbison, from Roy Orbison's Sun Recordings 1957 covered by Ken Cook 1958
"I Was A Fool", song by Larry Williams,	Williams 1958
"I Was A Fool", song by Rockhouse, Bob Plumb 1980
"I Was A Fool", song by Roland Stone, Fairchild, Angle	1962
"I Was A Fool", song by Ted Herold  	-	1988
"I Was A Fool", song by Tom Jones,  Myron, Byron	1965
"I Was A Fool", song by Sunflower Bean from Twentytwo in Blue 2018
"I Was a Fool (To Let You Go)", song by Barry Manilow from Even Now (Barry Manilow album)